Spygate may refer to:

 2007 Formula One espionage controversy, allegations that confidential technical information was passed among F1 teams
 Spygate (NFL), the disciplining of the New England Patriots for unauthorized videotaping of an opposing team's hand signals during the 2007 season
 Spygate (conspiracy theory), allegations that a spy was embedded in Donald Trump's 2016 presidential campaign
 Houston Astros sign stealing scandal, the disciplining of the Houston Astros for illegally using technology to steal an opposing team's signs during the 2017 MLB season
 A controversy over observation of an opponent's practice session during the 2018–19 Leeds United F.C. season